John Warden Brooke, 2nd Viscount Brookeborough, PC (NI) (9 November 1922 – 5 March 1987) was a Northern Irish politician. He was the son of Basil Brooke, 1st Viscount Brookeborough, third Prime Minister of Northern Ireland.

Early life
He was educated at Eton College. During the Second World War he served in the British Army in North Africa, Italy and Germany.  He was on the personal staff of Field Marshal Sir Harold Alexander (later created Lord Alexander). He was an Aide-de-Camp to Field Marshal Lord Wavell, the Viceroy of India, early in 1947.

In 1934, his father claimed in the House of Commons of Northern Ireland at Stormont that there had been a plot to kidnap the young John Brooke by Irish Republicans during Sir Basil Brooke's time as Commandant of the Ulster Special Constabulary. This report led Sir Basil (as he then was) to dismiss every Catholic worker in his employ, for which he was accused of sectarianism.

Political career
As Captain John Brooke, he was elected to Fermanagh County Council for the Ulster Unionist Party (UUP) in 1947, serving until 1973, and was Chairman of the council from 1961 to 1973. He was appointed High Sheriff of Fermanagh for 1955. He succeeded his father as the UUP Stormont MP for Lisnaskea in a by-election on 22 March 1968. He retained that seat until the abolition of the Parliament of Northern Ireland in 1973.

Brookeborough (when he was still Captain Brooke) was a member of a dissident group of Ulster Unionist backbench MPs who campaigned for the removal of Terence O'Neill as Prime Minister of Northern Ireland. When O'Neill finally resigned in April 1969 his successor, Major James Chichester-Clark, brought some of this dissident group into his government. Capt. Brooke was made Parliamentary Secretary at the Ministry of Commerce (1969–1970), and then Parliamentary Secretary at the Department of the Prime Minister (1970–1972). Under Brian Faulkner's premiership, he was Government Chief Whip (1971–1972) and also served in the Cabinet from 1971 as Minister of State in the Ministry of Finance.

In the Northern Ireland Assembly (1973–74) he represented North Down. When the Unionist Party of Northern Ireland (UPNI) was founded by pro-Sunningdale Agreement members of the UUP, Brooke joined in 1974 and was again elected for North Down to the Northern Ireland Constitutional Convention (1975–76). He also represented the views of the UPNI in the House of Lords from 1973.

At 5:13pm on 28 March 1972, Capt. Brooke delivered the final speech from the dispatch box in the House of Commons of Northern Ireland at Stormont prior to the proroguing of the Parliament of Northern Ireland by Edward Heath's Conservative government. In it, he quoted from a poem by Rudyard Kipling entitled Ulster, written in 1914, about the time his father's involvement in Ulster loyalism might be said to have begun. It ended:

    "Before an empire's eyes the traitor claims his price.
    What need of further lies? We are the sacrifice."

Family
Lord Brookeborough married Rosemary Chichester, daughter of Lieutenant-Colonel Arthur O'Neill Cubitt Chichester, of Galgorm Castle, County Antrim, in 1949. They had five children: Alan, Christopher, Juliana, Melinda and Susanna. Rosemary, Lady Brookeborough, died in January 2007. She had lived at Ashbrooke House, the dower house on the family's Colebrooke Estate near Brookeborough in County Fermanagh, for many years.

See also
 List of Northern Ireland Members of the House of Lords

References

External links

Brookeborough, John Brooke, 2nd Viscount
Brookeborough, John Brooke, 2nd Viscount
Members of Fermanagh County Council
People educated at Eton College
Brookeborough, John Brooke, 2nd Viscount
Politicians from County Fermanagh
Ulster Unionist Party members of the House of Commons of Northern Ireland
Unionist Party of Northern Ireland politicians
High Sheriffs of County Fermanagh
Members of the House of Commons of Northern Ireland 1965–1969
Members of the House of Commons of Northern Ireland 1969–1973
Members of the Northern Ireland Assembly 1973–1974
Members of the Northern Ireland Constitutional Convention
Brookeborough, John Brooke, 2nd Viscount
Northern Ireland Cabinet ministers (Parliament of Northern Ireland)
Northern Ireland junior government ministers (Parliament of Northern Ireland)
British Army personnel of World War II
Royal Inniskilling Fusiliers officers
Royal Armoured Corps officers
Members of the House of Commons of Northern Ireland for County Fermanagh constituencies
Ulster Unionist Party hereditary peers